Jonas George Howard (May 22, 1825 – October 5, 1911) was an American lawyer and politician who served two terms as a U.S. Representative from Indiana from 1885 to 1889.

Early life and career 
Born on a farm near New Albany, Indiana, Howard attended private school, Indiana Asbury College (now De Pauw University), Greencastle, Indiana, and Louisville (Kentucky) Law School.

He was graduated from the law department of Indiana University at Bloomington in 1851.
He was admitted to the bar in 1852 and commenced the practice of law in Jeffersonville, Indiana.
City attorney of Jeffersonville in 1854, 1865 from 1871 to 1873, and 1877-1879.

He served as a member of the city council 1859-1863.
He served as a member of the State house of representatives 1863-1866.

Congress 
Howard was elected as a Democrat to the Forty-ninth and Fiftieth Congresses (March 4, 1885 – March 3, 1889).
He was an unsuccessful candidate for renomination in 1888.

Later career and death 
He returned to Jeffersonville, Indiana, where he resumed the practice of law.
He also engaged in agricultural pursuits.

He died in Jeffersonville, Indiana, October 5, 1911.
He was interred in Walnut Ridge Cemetery.

References

1825 births
1911 deaths
Indiana University Maurer School of Law alumni
People from Floyd County, Indiana
DePauw University alumni
Democratic Party members of the United States House of Representatives from Indiana
19th-century American politicians